Chen Li (1351–1408) was the second and the last emperor of the Chinese Chen Han dynasty. Chen Li ruled from 1363–64.

Chen Han
Chen Li was born in Mianyang ( now Xiantao, Hubei) as the second son of Chen Youliang, the first emperor of the Chen Han during the Yuan-Ming transition. His brother Chen Shan, was a crown prince who joined the Ming army.

In 1363, his father Chen Youliang was shot by an arrow in the Battle of Poyang Lake. His brother Chen Shan fled to the Ming. Later Zhang Dingbian and other top generals protected Chen Li and his descendants, escorting Chen to Wuchang, where Chen changed he succeeded the throne and changed era name to Deshou. In the winter of the same year, Zhu Yuanzhang personally visited Wuchang.

Chen Youliang's father, Chen Pucai, was named Cheng En Hou, his eldest brother, Chen Youfu, was named Guirenbo, and his second brother, Chen Youzhi, was named Huai Enbo. He posthumously presented his fourth brother, Chen Youren, as King of Kangshan, and ordered the relevant officials to set up a temple to offer sacrifices, and his fifth brother, Chen Yougui, was in charge of sacrifices.

In 1364, he surrendered to Zhu Yuanzhang of the rising Ming dynasty. Zhu then appointed him as Marquis of Guide ( Guide Hou). Chen was later sent to Korea, where he became known as King Chen. In Korea, Chen settled down and had children, starting the Yangsan Jin Clan (see below).

Descendants 
Some of Chen Li's descendants after the Chen Han and Ming have the surname Cheng.

Yangsan Jin clan 
According to Korean and Chinese historical sources, in 1372, he migrated to Goryeo and had offspring, starting the Yangsan Jin clan. One of his known sons was Chen Mingshan.

On 19 May 1372, Chen Li and Ming Sheng arrived in Korea with a group of 27 people, who were received by the King of Korea. At that time, Chen Li was 22 years old. 

After Chen Li arrived in Korea, he was called Chen Wang or King Chen. On 6 June, King Gongmin gave Chen Li nine bamboo cloths. Chen was also given some land, a wife, housemaid, and food. During this time he had children, including Chen Mingshan. Chen Li passed away due to illness but is survived by his descendants in Korea and the Yangsan Jin Clan.

Anecdote 
[To be translated]

See also
 Yangsan Jin clan (Chen's descendants in Korea)
 Ming Yuzhen
 Yeonan Myeong clan
 Seochok Myeong clan

Notes

Citations

Further reading 
 The Cambridge History of China Volume 7, pp. 65-89

Chinese emperors
Yuan dynasty people
14th-century Chinese people
Transition from Yuan to Ming